The 1999 International League season took place from April to September 1999.

The Charlotte Knights defeated the Durham Bulls to win the league championship.

Attendance
Buffalo Bisons - 684,051
Charlotte Knights - 353,303
Columbus Clippers - 463,874
Durham Bulls - 474,494
Indianapolis Indians - 658,250
Louisville Bats - 361,419
Norfolk Tides - 486,727
Ottawa Lynx - 195,979
Pawtucket Red Sox - 596,624
Richmond Braves - 523,670
Rochester Red Wings - 481,039
Scranton/Wilkes-Barre Red Barons - 458,122
Syracuse Chiefs - 446,025
Toledo Mud Hens - 295,173

Playoffs

Division series
The North Division Scranton Red Barons (78-66) faced the IL Wild Card the Charlotte Knights (82-62). Charlotte defeated Scranton.

The South Division Champion Durham Bulls (83-60) faced the West Division Champion Columbus Clippers (83-58). Durham defeated Columbus.

Championship series
Charlotte defeated Durham 3 games to 1.

Charlotte faced the PCL Champions the (Vancouver Canadians) from the Pacific Coast League in the Triple-A World Series. Vancouver won the Series 3 games to 2.

References

External links
International League official website 

 
International League seasons